Second Creek is a stream in the U.S. state of West Virginia. It is a tributary of the Greenbrier River.

The stream most likely was named for the fact it was the second creek on an old Indian trail.

See also
List of rivers of West Virginia

References

Rivers of Greenbrier County, West Virginia
Rivers of Monroe County, West Virginia
Rivers of West Virginia